The Globe KDG Snipe was an American target drone, built by the Globe Aircraft Corporation for use by the United States Navy. The KDG, and its modified version, the KD3G Snipe, served between 1946 and the early 1950s.

Design and development
The KDG Snipe was a small, mid-winged target drone, operated by radio control. The Snipe was designed to be launched by use of a catapult system; if the aircraft was not destroyed during its mission, it would deploy a parachute for recovery. The KDG was powered by a McCulloch 4300 two-stroke engine; an improved version, designated KD3G, was powered by a  Kiekhaefer O-45 opposed piston engine.

Operational history
The Snipe entered service with the U.S. Navy in 1946; the KDG had been retired from service by 1950. The improved KD3G model remained in service through the early 1950s.

Variants
KDG-1
Basic model with McCulloch 4300 engine.
KDG-2
KDG-1 with 24-volt electrical system.
KD3G-1
KDG-1 with Kiekhaefer O-45-35 engine.
KD3G-2
KD3G-1 with 28-volt electrical system.

Specifications (KD3G-2)

References

Citations

Bibliography

KD1G
1940s United States special-purpose aircraft
Single-engined tractor aircraft
Mid-wing aircraft
Target drones of the United States
Aircraft first flown in 1946